Darkness and Light is the fourth album by the Norwegian symphonic power metal band Keldian. It was released on 27 October 2017 via Perris Records.

Track listing

Song information
Life and Death Under Strange New Suns
Based on the Mass Effect trilogy.

Credits
Christer Andresen – lead vocals, guitars, bass 
Arild Aardalen – synthesizers, vocals

Additional Musicians
Jørn Holen – drums
Marit Lovise Rode – vocals 
Vemund Osland – guitar solo, co-solo
Helene Hande Midje – backing vocals
Hjalmar Sivertsen Frønningen – backing vocals

References

2017 albums
Keldian albums